C. macrocarpa may refer to:
 Carissa macrocarpa, the Natal plum, a shrub native to South Africa
 Clinosperma macrocarpa, a palm tree species found in New Caledonia
 Cupressus macrocarpa, the Monterey cypress, a tree species, known simply as macrocarpa in Australia and New Zealand

See also 
 Macrocarpa (disambiguation)